The 1956–57 William & Mary Indians men's basketball team represented the College of William & Mary in intercollegiate basketball during the 1956–57 NCAA University Division men's basketball season. Under the fifth, and final, year of head coach Boydson Baird, the team finished the season 9–18, 7–11 in the Southern Conference. This was the 52nd season of the collegiate basketball program at William & Mary, whose nickname is now the Tribe. William & Mary played its home games at Blow Gymnasium.

The Indians finished in 6th place in the conference and qualified for the 1957 Southern Conference men's basketball tournament, held at the Richmond Arena. However, William & Mary fell to VPI in the quarterfinals.

Program notes
William & Mary played two teams for the first time this season: Lafayette and Columbia.

Schedule

|-
!colspan=9 style="background:#006400; color:#FFD700;"| Regular season

|-
!colspan=9 style="background:#006400; color:#FFD700;"| 1957 Southern Conference Basketball Tournament

Source

References

William & Mary Tribe men's basketball seasons
William and Mary Indians
William and Mary Indians Men's Basketball Team
William and Mary Indians Men's Basketball Team